The ED72 (manufacturer's designation: Pafawag 5Bs/6Bs) is a Polish four-car, long distance EMU operated by Przewozy Regionalne (Polregio). Like its cousin (EN71), the ED72 is based on the EN57 and became the basis for its successor: the ED73.

History
Between 1993 and 1997, a mere 21 units were built by Pafawag. The newly built ED72s were assigned to large interregional transit operations in the towns of Poznań, Szczecin, Kraków, and Bydgoszcz.

The series was created as an "upmarket" replacement for the more spartan EN57 and EN71 electric multiple units. Unfortunately, the express passenger service, InterRegio, for which the series was designed didn't find the ED72 to be quite as comfortable as they had hoped.

Currently, all 21 units are still in use, servicing mostly InterRegio and some local Regio and RegioPlus trains.

Modifications
The ED72 introduced a number of innovations over the previous series of EMUs. Amongst these was converting the rb (rear control cars) sections to first class units which were fitted with more comfortable seats, as well as new upholstery in the second class carriages. Double glazed windows were fitted; buttons for opening and closing the doors were installed — rather than having to wait for the driver to operate them; and matrix route manifests were installed, as opposed to the traditional blinds which only displayed the train's destination. The last unit to be produced — ED72-021 — is unique in that it has sliding doors that open outwards.

In terms of the unit's appearance, the major difference — apart from the red and yellow colour scheme — is the control car's frontal aspect. Furthermore, ED72s were originally equipped with single-arm pantographs, but most have been converted to using the traditional, diamond-shaped, double-arm version.

The ED72's couplers allow it to be easily connected to other EMUs, and this is done quite frequently.

Rebuilds and refurbishment

20 of the 21 ED72 units (except the last one) have been either rebuilt by ZNTK "Minsk Mazowiecki" and PESA Bydgoszcz or refurbished by Polregio Rolling Stock Repair Plant in Kruszewiec between 2011 and 2020. 6 units have been rebuilt to ED72A in 2011–2013, sporting a redesigned driver's cab design similar to rebuilt EN57 and EN71 "turbokibels", while another 6 units were rebuilt to ED72Ac in 2017–2018, sporting a much more streamlined driver's cab nose design somewhat reminiscent of the Pesa Elf. Interior-only refurbishments were performed by the aforementioned Polregio Rolling Stock Repair Plant on the remaining 8 units, mainly including new bike racks.

Resources
Modern Locos Gallery
Rail Service
www.lokomotywy.prv.pl
Mikoleje
Chabówka Rail Museum

See also
Polish locomotives designation

Electric multiple units of Poland
Pafawag multiple units